Gen. Piotr Jaroszewicz (8 October 1909 – 1 September 1992) was a post World War II Polish political figure. He served as the Prime Minister of Poland between 1970 and 1980. After he was forced out of office he lived quietly in a suburb of Warsaw until his murder in 1992.

Life and career
Jaroszewicz was born on 8 October 1909 in Nieśwież, in the Minsk Governorate of the Russian Empire (present-day Belarus). After finishing the secondary school in Jasło he started working as a teacher and headmaster in Garwolin. After the outbreak of World War II and the Nazi-Soviet alliance established by the Molotov–Ribbentrop Pact he moved to Soviet-occupied zone of Poland. It has been claimed that he was a headmaster in Pinsk gymnasia. However, on 10 July 1940 he was deported to Slobodka, Krasnoborski region, Arkhangelsk, from Stolin together with his first wife Oksana Gregorevna (born in Salov/Calow 1914) and daughter Olila (born 1940). In 1943 he joined the 1st Polish Army of Gen. Zygmunt Berling. The following year he joined the Polish Workers Party and was promoted to deputy political commander of the 1st Army.

After the war he became the deputy minister of defense (1945–1950). Since 1956 he was the Polish ambassador to COMECON. At the same time between 1952 and 1970 he served as a deputy Prime Minister of Poland and briefly (1954–1956) as the minister of mining industry. Jaroszewicz was a member of the Central Committee of the Polish United Workers' Party since its creation in 1948 and since 1964 he was also a member of the Political Bureau. From December 1970 until February 1980 he was the Prime Minister of Poland. The economical policies of Jaroszewicz and Edward Gierek led to a wave of protests in 1976 and 1980. In 1980 he gave up all his party posts and was expelled from the party the following year.

Death
After his departure from office and the party, Jaroszewicz and second wife Alicja Solska settled in the Warsaw suburb of Anin. The couple largely kept to themselves and did not socialize much. Jaroszewicz was obsessed with security; he had a 3.3-metre (11-foot) fence topped with barbed wire installed around their villa. When he walked their Rottweiler, neighbours said, he often carried a pistol with him.

Despite these measures, their son Jan Jaroszewicz found the couple murdered when he entered the house on 3 September 1992. Poison gas had been used to incapacitate the dog. Jaroszewicz's body, found in his upstairs study, had the belt that had been used to strangle him intact secured by an antique ice axe from his collection. The attackers had also beaten him, yet had bandaged the wounds.

Solska's body was next to her husband's. Her hands had been tied behind her back, and she had been shot in the head at close range with one of the couple's hunting rifles. Investigators believe that she had earlier managed to injure one of the killers during a struggle with him or her, since blood from her and an unknown individual were found in another room in the house.

The killers appeared to have searched every room in the house. It was initially reported that they only took what were presumed to have been documents from one safe and left behind valuable old coins and art were left behind, suggesting the thieves were not motivated by financial gain. However police records show the thieves actually stole two guns, 5 thousand. German marks, five gold coins and a ladies' watch.

Friends and family said that Jaroszewicz had been even more paranoid than usual in the days before the murders, which were determined to have occurred on 1 September, two days before the bodies were discovered. The killings received significant media attention in Poland, due both to Jaroszewicz's past leadership and the brutality of the crime. Unproven theories circulated that the killers had been looking for information with which to blackmail Solidarity leaders or victims of the Communist regime looking for revenge or evidence of past crimes. However, in 2017 Warsaw police revealed the burglary had been committed by the 'Karate Gang' of Radom, a group of violent criminals active through the 1990s. They had broken into Jaroszewicz's home expecting to find significant sums of money and tortured him in an effort to find it. When Jaroszewicz broke free the gang murdered both him and his wife, then hurriedly left. Several Karate gang members went on trial for this and other crimes in 2021. They denied any political motivation for the burglary.

See also

List of prime ministers of Poland
List of unsolved murders

References

External links

1909 births
1992 deaths
Deputy Prime Ministers of Poland
Male murder victims
Members of the Polish Sejm 1947–1952
Members of the Polish Sejm 1952–1956
Members of the Polish Sejm 1957–1961
Members of the Polish Sejm 1961–1965
Members of the Polish Sejm 1965–1969
Members of the Polish Sejm 1969–1972
Members of the Polish Sejm 1972–1976
Members of the Polish Sejm 1976–1980
Members of the Polish Sejm 1980–1985
Members of the Politburo of the Polish United Workers' Party
People from Nesvizh
People from Slutsky Uyezd
Polish generals
Polish military personnel of World War II
People murdered in Poland
Polish murder victims
Polish Workers' Party politicians
Prime Ministers of the Polish People's Republic
Recipients of the Order of Polonia Restituta (1944–1989)
Recipients of the Order of the Builders of People's Poland
Recipients of the Order of the Cross of Grunwald, 2nd class
Unsolved murders in Poland